Horst-Rüdiger Schlöske, né Pfau (born 1 January 1946 in Berlin) is a former sprinter who specialized in the 400 metres. He represented West Germany.

Achievements

West German male sprinters
Athletes (track and field) at the 1972 Summer Olympics
Olympic athletes of West Germany
Athletes from Berlin
1946 births
Living people
European Athletics Championships medalists